Megacerus leucospilus is a species of leaf beetle in the family Chrysomelidae. It is found in Central America, North America, and Oceania.

References

Bruchinae
Articles created by Qbugbot
Beetles described in 1885